Norman Park railway station is located on the Cleveland line in Queensland, Australia. It serves the Brisbane suburb of Norman Park.

History
Norman Park station opened in 1911. Between 1912 and 1926 it was the Junction station for the Belmont Tramway.  The steam tram was initially operated by the Belmont Shire Council and after 1925 by the Brisbane City Council until its closure in 1926.

On 15 July 1996, the Fisherman Islands line to the Port of Brisbane opened to the north of the station.

Services
Norman Park is served by Cleveland line services from Shorncliffe, Northgate, Doomben and Bowen Hills to Cannon Hill, Manly and Cleveland.

Services by platform

Murals 
The walls of the station were decorated with artwork featuring flora, fauna and scenery from the area circa 2009. It was painted by a team of professional artists with input from students from local schools.

References

External links

Norman Park station Queensland's Railways on the Internet
[ Norman Park station] TransLink travel information

Railway stations in Brisbane
Railway stations in Australia opened in 1911
Norman Park, Queensland